Malin Airport ,  is a public airport  southeast of Malin in Klamath County, in the U.S. state of Oregon.

External links

Airports in Klamath County, Oregon